Conasprella henckesi is a species of sea snail, a marine gastropod mollusk in the family Conidae, the cone snails and their allies.

Like all species within the genus Conasprella, these snails are predatory and venomous. They are capable of "stinging" humans, therefore live ones should be handled carefully or not at all.

Distribution
This species occurs in the Atlantic Ocean off Northeast Brasil.

Description 
The maximum recorded shell length is 17.3 mm.

Habitat 
Minimum recorded depth is 1 m. Maximum recorded depth is 2 m.

References

External links
 The Conus Biodiversity website
 Cone Shells – Knights of the Sea
 

henckesi
Gastropods described in 2004